The Women's Cricket Association of India (WCAI) was the national governing body of women's cricket in India. It was founded in 1973 at Pune, Maharashtra. It was merged into the Board of Control for Cricket in India (BCCI) in 2007. Premala Chavan, a Member of Parliament was its first president. 

Its team the India women's national cricket team represented India in women's international cricket. After its merger the team is govern by BCCI.

History 
While women played cricket in India in significant numbers since early 1970's, there was no organization as such until the formation of WCAI by Mahendra Kumar Sharma - it was registered by him as the founder secretary in 1973 in Lucknow under the Indian Societies Act. 

Following the international boycott of South Africa, the 1978 Women's Cricket World Cup was shifted to India and organized by WCAI.

Nutan Gavaskar, the sister of Sunil Gavaskar, was a honorary general secretary of WCAI.

Following the merger of International Women's Cricket Council into International Cricket Council in 2006, WCAI merged into Board of Control for Cricket in India in 2007. Ranee Narah and Shubhangi Kulkarni were the president and secretary of WCAI respectively before the merger.

See also 
Cricket in India
Sport in India 
Women's Premier League (WPL)

References 

 
 

 
 Organisations based in Pune
 1973 establishments in Maharashtra
Cricket administration in India
Women's cricket in India
Organizations established in 1973
Cricket in Pune